Léon Fichot (12 October 1906 – 15 August 1992) was a French racing cyclist. He rode in the 1932 Tour de France.

References

1906 births
1992 deaths
French male cyclists
Place of birth missing